George VanStavoren Kelley (March 23, 1843 – November 4, 1905) was a line officer in the Union Army during the American Civil War. He received the Medal of Honor for gallantry at the Battle of Franklin during the 1864 Franklin-Nashville Campaign.

Biography
Kelley was born and raised in enlisted in Massillon, Ohio. Following the outbreak of the Civil War and President Abraham Lincoln's call for volunteers, he enlisted in his hometown in the 104th Ohio Infantry on April 22, 1861. Kelley served as a sergeant in Company A. The regiment moved to Covington, Kentucky, on September 1, 1862, in preparation for the Defense of Cincinnati against a threatened Confederate invasion by troops under Edmund Kirby Smith. It was involved in the subsequent Skirmish at Fort Mitchell, Kentucky.

Kelley and his comrades in the 104th OVI spent 1863 in Kentucky, and then moved to East Tennessee until April 1864. They were reassigned to duty as part of the XXIII Corps in Georgia, and Tennessee in late 1864. Kelley was promoted to captain and commander of Company A. He captured a Confederate flag during the fighting at Franklin in November and was awarded the Medal of Honor a few months later. The regiment subsequently served in Washington, D.C. and North Carolina. Kelley was mustered out of the army on June 14, 1865.

After the war, Kelley returned to Ohio. At the age of 24, he married Fannie Bliss on October 18, 1866. Following her death, he moved to Denver, Colorado, and became a rancher. On May 15, 1890, he married a local resident Louisa Talitha Holloway (February 13, 1865 – February 6, 1902).

He is buried in that city's Riverside Cemetery.

Medal of Honor citation
Rank and organization: Captain, Company A, 104th Ohio Infantry. Place and date: At Franklin, Tenn., November 30, 1864. Entered service at: Massillon, Ohio. Born: March 23, 1843, Massillon, Ohio. Date of issue: February 13, 1865.

Citation:
Capture of flag supposed to be of Cheatham's Corps (C.S.A.).

See also

List of Medal of Honor recipients
 Wikipedia Riverside Cemetery

Notes

References

External links
 
 104th Ohio Infantry by Larry Stevens
 Northwest Ohio in the Civil War
 Battle of Utoy Creek

United States Army Medal of Honor recipients
Union Army officers
People of Ohio in the American Civil War
People from Massillon, Ohio
1843 births
1905 deaths
American Civil War recipients of the Medal of Honor